Invasion of Belgium may refer to:
 German invasion of Belgium (1914)
 German invasion of Belgium (1940)

See also
 List of wars involving Belgium